George G. Epoch (April 18, 1920 - September 30, 1986) was a Canadian priest,   a member of the Jesuit Fathers of Upper Canada. From 1971 to 1983, Epoch abused over 120 children at the Jesuit mission of Wikwemikong and  St Mary's church of Cape Kroker and Saugeen, all of which are first nations reserves in Ontario, Canada.

Life
In 1938, he began his Jesuit studies in Guelph. Epoch was ordained as a Jesuit priest on June 22, 1952. He died in residence at the Holy Cross Mission at Wikwemikong in 1986.

Sexual abuse allegations
Reports of sexual abuse by father Epoch are recorded as early as 1985. In 1990, claims of sexual abuse by father George Epoch began to be publicized. The abuse claims concerned his work in three Jesuit missions on first-nations reserves in Ontario, Canada: Wikwemikong, St Mary's church of Cape Kroker and Saugeen.
  
In 2018, a class action lawsuit filed against the Roman Catholic Archdiocese of Halifax–Yarmouth claimed that in 1962, Epoch assaulted a young boy in the garment room of the church, and later in Epoch's room at the priest's communal residence.

Reparations
On August 30, 1992, The Jesuit Fathers of Upper Canada publicly apologized for Epoch's abuse of the children. The next year, after negotiations, they paid financial settlements to over 100 of the abused children.

References 

1920 births
1986 deaths
20th-century Canadian Jesuits
Catholic Church sexual abuse scandals in Canada
Sexual abuse scandal in the Society of Jesus
Violence against men in North America